Ripe is a 1996 American independent drama film released in 1997. It was the first film written and directed by Mo Ogrodnik and starred Monica Keena and Daisy Eagan.

Plot 
Fraternal twin sisters Rosie (Daisy Eagan) and Violet (Monica Keena) lead a life of hard knocks with very poor, abusive parents. Glad to be rid of their parents who have been killed in a car crash, the twins vow to run away to Kentucky in search of a better life. While on the road, the girls sneak onto a military base seeking food and shelter and meet up with Pete, a drifter working as a grounds keeper, who takes them in.

Throughout the movie there are overtones of Rosie's jealousy over the attention the pretty Violet receives from men. For example, when Violet and Pete start a relationship, Rosie becomes increasingly jealous before eventually coming to realize that the sisters' childhood bond has been destroyed forever. Her attitude leads to actions with tragic consequences.

In the movie’s final scene, Violet is seen flying away on a plane after leaving Rosie. Rosie holds the gun in her mouth, firing with every chamber. However, Violet holds the bullets in her hand, revealing she took them out prior to her departure.

Cast
Monica Keena as Voilet
Daisy Eagan as Rosie
Karen Lynn Gorney

Trivia
Aerial coordination for the movie was done by well known South Carolina skydiver and pilot Bobby Frierson. Local Barnwell, SC skydivers John Adair, Mike Holbert, and Terry Curtis were cast as paratroopers. Nine years after "Ripe" was filmed Bobby died in a skydiving accident on September 11, 2005. He'd had a stroke on January 30, 2000.

References

External links

American independent films
1997 films
1997 drama films
American drama films
1997 directorial debut films
1997 independent films
1990s English-language films
1990s American films